Summer in Transylvania is a live action children's television programme which aired on Nickelodeon. The programme, originally called Freaky Farleys, was renamed Summer in Transylvania and was filmed in Hendon, London. It is Nickelodeon UK's first original TV series since Genie in the House. It was announced on 23 June 2012 that the programme would not return for a second series.

Plot 
Teenager Summer Farley (Sophie Stuckey) moves to Transylvania with her father and brother. She then starts at her new high school, Stoker High, which is filled with zombies, werewolves, vampires, mummies and many other sorts of monsters.
She tries to get through school with help from her friends, Heidi the zombie (Amy Wren) and Bobby the werewolf (Kane Ricca).

Cast

Humans 
Sophie Stuckey as Summer Farley – The main character. Smart, cute and witty, Summer is really nice and one of the two humans attending her school. She has two best friends, Heidi and Bobby; even if Bobby is in love with her, she considers him just a friend. She tries to fit in and goes on many dates.
Eros Vlahos as Jake Farley – Summer's younger brother.
Richard Lumsden as Dr Mike Farley – Summer's father.

Monsters 
Amy Wren as Heidi – Summer's girl best friend, she's a zombie. She's nice but is not afraid to say what she thinks. She wears wacky neon clothes. She has proven to be a good friend, but a bit of a show off like when she tried to take Antonio off of Summer.
Kane Ricca as Bobby – Sweet, funny, he's a werewolf. He has a huge crush on Summer and is her boy best friend. He doesn't like when Summer dates other guys.
Dan Black as Rolf – a werewolf, he's Serena's boyfriend. Hot, but unusually quiet, his breath apparently stinks.
Charlie Evans as Serena – Beautiful, mysterious but very mean, she's a vampire. She makes Summer miserable, however she has been a tad kind to Summer in episode Banned so Summer could help her. She seems to be friendly at times; yet she gets jealous of other girls around Rolf.
 Andrew Harrison as Dr Tempest – Principal of Darkness and Head of English, he's a teacher at Stoker High. He's a vampire.

Others 
Lee Simmonds as Bolt – a Frankenstein monster, he's Jake's best friend.
Phillipa Peak as Magda – Summer and her father Mike Farley's housekeeper, apparently human but there are suggestions there is more to her than meets the eye. She has a crush on Mike Farley.

Episodes

References

External links 
 

2010 British television series debuts
2012 British television series endings
2010s British children's television series
2010s British comedy television series
British children's comedy television series
British children's fantasy television series
English-language television shows
Television shows set in London
Television series by Banijay
British high school television series
Television series about teenagers